Algorismus may refer to:
 Algorismus (Norse text), a section of Hauksbók
 Algorism, 13th century Latin writings on numerical calculation methods using the newly introduced Hindu-Arabic numerals, eventually replacing the older Roman numerals centuries later

See also 
 Al-Khwārizmī, a Persian mathematician who wrote an Arabic book on Algorism centuries before the Hindu-Arabic number system became known in Europe. Latin authors began to read his name as ALGOR, which led to the word Algorismus as used by Latin authors in Europe
 Algorithm (disambiguation)